Danny De Bie (born 23 January 1960) is a former Belgian professional cyclist and directeur sportif, who won the men's race at the 1989 UCI Cyclo-cross World Championships. His brothers Eddy De Bie and Rudy De Bie also competed professionally.

Career
Born in Beersel, De Bie achieved several successes on the road but started to focus on cyclo-cross full-time after taking the silver medal at the 1987 UCI Cyclo-cross World Championships. He went to Switzerland which was at that time the main place for cyclo-cross races. Two years later he achieved that. The World Cyclo-Cross Championships parcours at Pont-Château in 1989, was a course that was suited to him. De Bie was able to cycle up a tough climb of almost 100 metres where his opponents such as Adri van der Poel had to walk and as a result De Bie was able to make a gap every time he went over the climb. After winning the rainbow jersey, De Bie became one of the best cyclo crossers of the world with a win in the Superprestige classification and increased popularity for the sport in Belgium.

In 1991 De Bie was suspected of possible tampering with a doping control after a Superprestige race in Zillebeke and he was not allowed to take part in the World Championships that year in Gieten. De Bie was Belgium cyclo-cross champion for three years in a row and then beaten by Paul Herijgers. De Bie in his career won 11 Superprestige races.

Major Results

Cyclo-cross 

 1987
 2nd Cyclocross Zillebeke
 2nd  UCI World CX Championships
 1988
 1st Druivenveldrit Overijse
 1st Duinencross Koksijde
 2nd Cyclocross Putte-Peulis 
 3rd  National CX Championships
 1989
 1st  UCI World CX Championships
 1st Superprestige Diegem
 1st Azencross Loenhout
 1st Cyclocross Mol
 1st Cyklokros Plzeň
 1st Duinencross Koksijde
 1st Cyclocross Valenswaard
 1st Superprestige Gieten
 1st Jaarmarktcross Niel
 1st Cyclocross Breendonk
 2nd Druivenveldrit Overijse
 2nd Zürich-Waid
 2nd Cyclo-cross Gavere
 3rd  National CX Championships
 3rd Cyclocross Wetzikon
 1990
 1st  National CX Championships
1st Cyclo-cross Superprestige
 1st Azencross Loenhout
 1st Druivenveldrit Overijse
 1st Superprestige Gieten
 1st Cyklokros Plzeň
 1st Cyclocross Contern
 1st Cyclo-cross Gavere
 1st Cyclocross Zillebeke
 2nd Cyclocross Harnes 
 3rd Cyclocross Valenswaard

1991
 1st  National CX Championships
 1st Superprestige Diegem
 1st Azencross Loenhout
 1st Cyclo-cross Kalmthout
 1st GP Essen
 1st Duinencross Koksijde
 1st Superprestige Gieten
 2nd Cyclocross Zillebeke
2nd Cyclo-cross Superprestige

1992
 1st  National CX Championships
 1st GP Essen
 1st Duinencross Koksijde
 1st Superprestige Gieten
2nd Cyclo-cross Superprestige
2nd Cyclo-cross Kalmthout
3rd Cyclo-cross Gavere

1993
 1st Cyclo-cross Kalmthout
 1st GP Essen
 1st Jaarmarktcross Niel
 2nd  National CX Championships
 2nd Ziklokross Igorre
 2nd Kasteelcross Zonnebeke
 2nd Cyclocross Harnes
 2nd UCI Cyclo-cross World Cup
 3rd Duinencross Koksijde
3rd Cyclo-cross Gavere
3rd Cyclo-cross Superprestige

1994
 2nd  National CX Championships
 2nd Kasteelcross Zonnebeke
2nd General Classification GvA Trophy
2nd UCI Cyclo-cross World Cup

1995
 2nd Kasteelcross Zonnebeke

1997
2nd Cyclocross Rijkevorsel
2nd Jaarmarktcross Niel
2nd Noordzeecross Middelkerke
3rd Cyclo-cross Gavere
3rd Cyclocross Oudenaarde

1998
1st CyclocrossRuddervoorde
2nd General Classification GvA Trophy

Road 
 1977
 1st Sint-Martinusprijs Kontich
 1978
 1st Dusika Jugend Tour
 1979
 1st Stage 7 Omloop van de Kempen
 1984
 1st Stage 3 Ronde van Brabant

References

External links

1960 births
Living people
Belgian male cyclists
Cyclo-cross cyclists
UCI Cyclo-cross World Champions (men)
People from Beersel
Cyclists from Flemish Brabant
Belgian cyclo-cross champions